Olivier Schaffter (born 7 October 1964) is a Swiss judoka. He competed at the 1988 Summer Olympics and the 1992 Summer Olympics.

References

External links
 

1964 births
Living people
Swiss male judoka
Olympic judoka of Switzerland
Judoka at the 1988 Summer Olympics
Judoka at the 1992 Summer Olympics
Place of birth missing (living people)
20th-century Swiss people